The Huff–Lamberton House is a historic house in Winona, Minnesota, United States.  It was built in 1857, and in 1873 it was given a Moorish Revival porch.  It was listed on the National Register of Historic Places in 1976 for its state-level significance in the theme of architecture.  It was nominated for being one of Minnesota's oldest and best preserved Italian Villa style houses.

History
Early Winona settlers Henry and Harriet Huff had this opulent brick house built for themselves in 1857, when the city's environment consisted mostly of rough lumber buildings and dirt roads.  Within a few years, the Huffs, having made a sufficient fortune, moved to Chicago and sold the house to Henry Lamberton.  He added the Moorish Revival porch in 1873 during the height of the late-19th-century Orientalism fad.

The house stayed in the Lamberton family until 1956, when the last heir died.  During the 1960s it was converted to an orphanage.  Sauer Memorial Homes purchased the house in 1982 and operated it as an assisted living facility for the next 24 years.  In 2006 they determined that they couldn't afford upgrades to make the house more handicap-accessible, and put it up for sale.  It languished on the market for five years, finally selling in 2011 for barely more than half of its assessed $1.1 million value.  Bluff City Properties, the new owners, planned to use the main house for senior housing while operating the carriage house and another outbuilding as event venues.

See also
 National Register of Historic Places listings in Winona County, Minnesota

References

External links
 

1857 establishments in Minnesota Territory
Buildings and structures in Winona, Minnesota
Houses completed in 1857
Houses in Winona County, Minnesota
Houses on the National Register of Historic Places in Minnesota
Italianate architecture in Minnesota
Moorish Revival architecture in Minnesota
National Register of Historic Places in Winona County, Minnesota